The Belarusian national revival is a social, cultural and political movement that advocates the revival of Belarusian culture, language, customs, and the creation of the Belarusian statehood at the national foundation.

In the early and mid 19th century, Jan Czeczot, Wladyslaw Syrokomla, Wincenty Dunin-Marcinkiewicz, Jan Barszczewski and several other writers, most of whom represented the local nobility, created the first literary works in modern Belarusian language. Their works were written in local rural dialects and ignored the traditions of the written Old Belarusian language from the period of the Grand Duchy of Lithuania.

In the second half of the 19th century, leftist national clubs emerged among Belarusian students in the major universities of the Russian Empire, i.e. in the University of St. Petersburg. These clubs issued several illegal publications, for example, Homan with demands for autonomy or independence for Belarus. Ignacy Hryniewiecki, the assassin of Tsar Alexander II of Russia, according to some historians, was one of the creators of the Belarusian faction in the Russian socialist movement Narodnaya Volya.

See also 
 Litvinism
 Belarusian nationalism
 Union of Belarusian Patriots
 Russification of Belarus

References

Belarusian nationalism
Political history of Belarus
19th century in Belarus
20th century in Belarus